Prud may refer to:

 Prud, Bosnia and Herzegovina, a village near Odžak, northern Bosnia
 Prud, Croatia, a village near Metković, southern Croatia